Madhya (Sanskrit for 'middle') may refer to:
 Madhya Pradesh, occasionally Madhya for short, a state in India
 Madhya, the middle tala in Indian classical music
 Madhya, the middle octave in Indian (especially Hindustani) classical music

See also 
 Madhva
Madhya Bharat S.C., a football club in India
Madhya Gujarat Vij, a power company in Gujarat, India
Madhya Kailash Temple, a Hindu temple in South Africa
Madhya Venal, a Malayalam film
Madhya Vidyalaya, a type of school in Sri Lanka

Geographic locations
Madhya Bharat, a former state of India
Madhya Kailash, a location in Tamil Nadu, India
Madhya Majuli, a location in Assam, India
Madhya Nepal Municipality, a municipality in Nepal